The E25 Turbo concept sports car was built by BMW as a celebration for the 1972 Summer Olympics in Munich. It was designed by Paul Bracq, with gullwing doors and was based on a modified 2002 chassis with a mid-mounted engine. The Turbo featured a 276 hp turbocharged version of the engine from the BMW 2002, foam-filled front and rear sections to absorb impact, side impact beams, a braking distance monitor utilizing radar, and a futuristic cockpit. The car developed  at 7100 rpm and could reach  from a standstill in 6.6 seconds.

Only two were ever built. BMW later used the Turbo's design themes on the M1, the 8 Series, the Z1 and the 2008 M1 Homage Concept. The BMW E-25 is however most similar to the BMW M1.

References

Turbo

Rear mid-engine, rear-wheel-drive vehicles